Chanticleer Point is a geographical landmark on the Oregon side of the Columbia River Gorge. It is the first notable overlook encountered traveling east on the Historic Columbia River Highway. It is a typical location from which to take photos of the gorge featuring Crown Point prominently. It overlooks Rooster Rock State Park.

The overlook is part of the Oregon state park system and its official name is the Portland Women's Forum State Scenic Viewpoint. A plaque placed at the site describes the Forum's support of this landmark.

References

External links

Columbia River Gorge
State parks of Oregon
Historic Columbia River Highway
Parks in Multnomah County, Oregon